Men's 10 metre air rifle was one of the fifteen shooting events at the 1996 Summer Olympics. Artem Khadjibekov defeated Wolfram Waibel in the final to win the gold medal.

Qualification round

OR Olympic record – Q Qualified for final

Final

OR Olympic record

References

Sources

Shooting at the 1996 Summer Olympics
Men's events at the 1996 Summer Olympics